Narayanpur is a village and a gram panchayat within the jurisdiction of the Namkhana police station in the Namkhana CD block in the Kakdwip subdivision of the South 24 Parganas district in the Indian state of West Bengal.

Geography

Demographics
As per 2011 Census of India, Narayanpur had a total population of 12,201.

Transport
Narayanpur is on the National Highway 12.

Namkhana railway station is located nearby.

Healthcare
There is a primary health centre at Narayanpur, with 6 beds.

References

Villages in South 24 Parganas district